Laird Plateau is a small plateau, over  above sea level, standing  northwest of Mount Hayter on the north side of the head of Lucy Glacier, Antarctica. It was seen by the New Zealand Geological Survey Antarctic Expedition (1964–65) and was named for Malcolm G. Laird, the leader of this geological party to the area, as was also Cape Laird.

References

Plateaus of Oates Land